Local government in England broadly consists of three layers: regional authorities, local authorities and parish councils. Legislation concerning English local government is passed by Parliament, as England does not have a devolved parliament.

This article does not cover the 31 police and crime commissioners or the four police, fire and crime commissioners of England.

Regional authorities

Greater London Authority 

The Greater London Authority Act 1999 established a Mayor of London and 25-member London Assembly. The first mayoral and assembly elections took place in 2000. The former Leader of the Greater London Council, Ken Livingstone, served as the inaugural Mayor, until he was defeated by future Prime Minister Boris Johnson in 2008. The incumbent, Sadiq Khan, was first elected in 2016.

The Mayor's functions include chairing Transport for London, holding the Commissioner of the Metropolitan Police and London Fire Commissioner to account and keeping strategies up to date, including the London Plan. Meanwhile, it is the Assembly's role to regularly hold the Mayor and their key advisers to account and it can also amend the budget or a strategy by a two-thirds majority, though this has not ever happened as of March 2022.

Combined authorities 

Combined authorities can be created at the request of two or more local authorities. Combined authorities don't replace the local authorities in question, but can receive separate functions and funding. As of May 2022, there are 10 combined authorities covering some of England. The Secretary of State was first granted the power to create combined authorities by the Local Democracy, Economic Development and Construction Act 2009.

The Cities and Local Government Devolution Act 2016 gave the Secretary of State the power to provide for a directly-elected combined authority mayor. And, as of May 2022, nine out of the 10 combined authorities have mayors, including Andy Burnham in Greater Manchester and Andy Street in the West Midlands. 

Each combined authority's executive consists of a representative from each of its constituent local authorities, plus (if applicable) the mayor. Functions can be devolved directly to the mayor, the combined authority as a whole or have a different decision-making requirement. The budget and functions of each combined authority can be vastly different, but possible functions include responsibility for the relevant police force and/or fire brigade, bus franchising and spatial strategy.

Combined county authorities 
Combined county authorities are a new type of local government body included in the Levelling-up and Regeneration Bill. They will only be made up of upper-tier local authorities; every type of local authority discussed below apart from district councils.

Local authorities 

There are 333 local authorities covering the whole of England. There are four main types of local authorities: London borough councils, two-tier county and district councils, metropolitan district councils and unitary authorities. Some local authorities have borough, city or royal borough status, but this is purely stylistic.

All local authorities are made up of councillors, who represent geographical wards. There are 7,026 wards as of December 2021. Local authorities run on four year cycles and councillors may be elected all at once, by halves or by thirds. Local authorities have a choice of executive arrangements under the Local Government Act 2000: mayor and cabinet executive, leader and cabinet executive, a committee system or bespoke arrangements approved by the Secretary of State. As of May 2022, just 16 local authorities have directly-elected mayors. Some functions are just the responsibility of the executive of a local authority, but local authorities must also have at least one overview and scrutiny committee to hold the executive to account.

The London Government Act 1963 established 32 London borough councils. It also established the Greater London Council, covering the whole of Greater London, but this was later abolished by the Local Government Act 1985. Greater London also includes the sui generis City of London Corporation. The other sui generis local authorities are the Council of the Isles of Scilly, Middle Temple and Inner Temple.

Outside Greater London and the Isles of Scilly, the Local Government Act 1972 divided England into metropolitan and non-metropolitan counties, which would have one county council and multiple district councils each. That meant that each area would be covered by both a county council and a district council, which would share local authority functions; two tiers of local authorities. In May 2022, 24 non-metropolitan county councils and 181 non-metropolitan district councils remain. These are better known as simply county councils and district councils. The Local Government Act 1985 also abolished metropolitan county councils, but there are still 36 metropolitan district councils as of May 2022.  

There are also (as of May 2022) 58 unitary authorities. These carry out the functions of both county and district councils and have replaced two-tier local government in some areas. The creation of these first became possible under the Local Government Act 1992, but now takes place under the Local Government and Public Involvement in Health Act 2007.

Specific functions of local authorities include maintaining some highways, granting planning permission and acting as a billing authority for the purposes of council tax. Separate to combined authorities, two or more local authorities can also work together through joint boards (for legally-required services: fire, public transport and waste disposal), joint committees (voluntarily) or through contracting out and agency arrangements. Notably, Cornwall Council has been subject to a devolution deal, which are usually reserved to combined authorities for additional functions and funding. And, like some combined authorities and parish councils, they do have a general power of competence.

Parish councils 
Parish councils form the lowest tier of local government. They can also resolve to call themselves a community council, a neighbourhood council, a village council, a town council or (if city status is granted) a city council, but this is purely stylistic. Parish councillors sit on parish councils.

As of December 2021, there are 10,475 parishes in England, but they do not cover the whole of the country (notably including the vast majority of Greater London).

The only specific statutory function of parish councils, which they must do, is establishing allotments. However, there are a number of other functions given by powers in the relevant legislation, which they can do, such as providing litter bins and building bus shelters. Their statutory functions are few, but they may provide other services with the agreement of the relevant local authorities, and under the Localism Act 2011 eligible parish councils can be granted a "general power of competence" (GPC) which allows them within certain limits the freedom to do anything an individual can do provided it is not prohibited by other legislation, as opposed to being limited to the powers explicitly granted to them by law. To be eligible for this a parish council must meet certain conditions of quality.

Funding 

Local councils are funded by a combination of central government grants, Council Tax (a locally set tax based on house value), Business Rates, and fees and charges from certain services including decriminalised parking enforcement. Up to 15 English councils risk insolvency, the National Audit Office maintains, and councils increasingly offer, "bare minimum" service. The New Local Government Network maintains most local authorities will only be able to provide the bare minimum of services five years from 2018.

Many of these funding sources are hypothecated (ring-fenced) - meaning that they can only be spent in a very specific manner - in essence, they merely pass through a council's accounts on their way from the funding source to their intended destination. These include:
Dedicated Schools Grant - funds any schools that are still managed by the local authority, rather than being autonomously run (principally academies, which are funded directly by central government); less than half of state-funded secondary schools are still reliant on this funding source. The Dedicated Schools Grant is often relatively large - and can typically be about 1/3 of all council funding. Hypothecation for this has been in place since 2006.
Housing Benefit Grant - funds housing benefit claims made in the council area, and related administration. Housing Benefit is being gradually replaced by an element within Universal Credit, and Pension Credit; these replacements will be administered centrally, and provided directly to claimants from central government.
Health & Wellbeing grant. This is intended to be used for measures to improve public wellbeing; the term has deliberately been left undefined, but is not intended to fund measures targeted at specific individuals (such as healthcare or social care), which are funded by other mechanisms. For example, this could be used to plant additional trees on streets, or to tidy the appearance of buildings.
Rents from tenants of council-owned housing. By law, these must in fact be paid into a distinct Housing Revenue Account, which can only be used for maintenance, management, and addition, of the council-owned housing stock, and cannot be used for funding any other council expenditure.
Fines and charges related to vehicle parking, and local road restrictions. By law, these can only be used to fund parking services, road repairs, enforcement of road restrictions, etc.

The other main central government grant - the Revenue Support Grant - is not hypothecated, and can be spent as the council wishes. For many decades, Business Rates were gathered locally, pooled together nationally, and then redistributed according to a complicated formula; these would be combined with the Revenue Support Grant to form a single Formula Grant to the council. Since 2013, a varyingly sized chunk of Business Rates is retained locally, and only the remainder is pooled and redistributed; the redistribution is according to a very basic formula, based mainly on the size of the 2013 Formula Grant to the relevant council, and is now provided to the council independently of the Revenue Support Grant.

Council Tax

Setting the rate 
When determining their budget arrangements, councils make a distinction between hypothecated funding and non-hypothecated funding. Consideration of all funding in general is referred to as gross revenue streams, while net revenue streams refers to funding from only non-hypothecated sources.

Historically, central government retained the right to cap an increase in Council Tax, if it deemed the council to be increasing it too severely. Under the Cameron–Clegg coalition, this was changed. Councils can raise the level of council tax as they wish, but must hold a local referendum on the matter, if they wish to raise it above a certain threshold set by central government, currently 3%.

Billing authorities 
Council Tax is collected by the principal council that has the functions of a district-level authority. It is identified in legislation as a billing authority, and was known as a rating authority. There are 314 billing authorities in England that collect council tax and business rates:

188 non-metropolitan district councils
56 unitary authority councils
36 metropolitan borough councils
32 London borough councils
City of London Corporation
Council of the Isles of Scilly

Precepting authorities 

Precepting authorities do not collect Council Tax directly, but instruct a billing authority to do it on their behalf by setting a precept. Major precepting authorities such as the Greater London Authority and county councils cover areas that are larger than billing authorities. Local precepting authorities such as parish councils cover areas that are smaller than billing authorities.

The precept shows up as an independent element on official information sent to council tax payers, but the council bill will cover the combined amount (the precepts plus the core council tax). The billing authority collects the whole amount, and then detaches the precept and funnels it to the relevant precepting authority.

Levying bodies 
Levying bodies are similar to precepting authorities, but instead of imposing a charge on billing authorities, the amount to be deducted is decided by negotiation. The Lee Valley Regional Park Authority is an example of a levying body. Voluntary joint arrangements, such as waste authorities are also in this category.

Aggregate External Finance 
Aggregate External Finance (AEF) refers to the total amount of money given by central government to local government. It consists of the Revenue Support Grant (RSG), ringfenced and other specific grants, and redistributed business rates. A portion of the RSG money paid to each authority is diverted to fund organisations that provide improvement and research services to local government (this is referred to as the RSG top-slice), for example the Local Government Association.

See also 
 List of local governments in the United Kingdom
 Political make-up of local councils in the United Kingdom
 Local government in Northern Ireland
 Local government in Scotland
 Local government in Wales

Reference 

 

eo:Loka regado kaj administrado en Britio